Leamy may refer to:

People with the surname 
 Andrew Leamy, a Quebec industrialist
 Denis Leamy
 Edmund Leamy
 John Leamy (hurler)
 John Leamy (merchant) (1757–1839), American trader with Spanish colonies
 Robin Leamy (bishop) (born 1934), New Zealand Roman Catholic bishop
 Robin Leamy (swimmer) (born 1961), American former swimmer
 James Patrick Leamy

Other 
 Leamy Lake in Gatineau, Quebec
 Casino du Lac-Leamy, a casino situated on the lake

See also
 Robert Leamy Meade

Surnames of Irish origin